Vinnexin is a transmembrane protein whose DNA code is held in a virus genome. When the virus genome is expressed in a cell the vinnexin gene from the virus is made into a functioning protein by the infected cell. The vinnexin protein is then incorporated into the host's cell membranes to alter the way the hosts cells communicate with each other. The altered communication aids the transmission and replication of the virus in complex ways. The communication structure that the vinnexin is involved in is the gap junction and vinnexin forms part of a wider family of proteins that are innexin homologues referred to as pannexins. So far Vinnexins have only been found in Adenovirus and the way they affect the functioning of innexins is being studied in great detail.

Discovery 
Vinnexin was first described in 2005 in an adenovirus as a gene homologue of an insect gap protein called innexin. Vinnexins were shown to be used by the adenovirus to help Incheon wasps successfully inject their eggs into the caterpillars they parasitize.

Structure 
The ultrastructure of Vinnexin is yet to be studied in detail. As an innexin homologue that functions in a similar way to innexins vinnexins are likely to have four transmembrane segments (TMSs) and, like the vertebrate connexin gap junction protein, vinnexin subunits assemble together to form a channel in the plasma membrane of the cell.

Function 
Fundamentally vinnexins have been shown to behave like the native innexins in insects. They participate in gap junctions to form transmembrane communication channels. At a higher level vinnexins must differ sufficiently from native innexins to alter the way the caterpillar host cells behave. Without the virus with its vinnexin gene the egg of certain wasps would be rejected by the caterpillar and the egg would die. The virus and wasp are obligately associated.   While the virus genes are expressed in the caterpillar the viral DNA including the vinnexin gene does not replicate its genes there. Replication of the virus including the vennexin gene occurs in the ovaries of the wasp.

Transport reaction
The transport reactions catalyzed by innexin gap junctions which are considered similar to vinnexins are:
Small molecules (cell 1 cytoplasm) ⇌ small molecules (cell 2 cytoplasm)
Or for hemichannels:
Small molecules (cell cytoplasm) ⇌ small molecules (out)

See also 
 innexin
 connexin
 pannexin

References

Further reading 

 
 
 

Transmembrane proteins